Mbre or Pere, known as Pεrε among themselves and as Bεrε by the locally dominant Koro, also spelled Pre and Bre, is an moribund language of the Ivory Coast.

It was first described in an unpublished manuscript by Denis Creissels. A grammar, dictionary and texts have been published by Jeffrey Heath and Brahima Tioté.

Sociolinguistic situation
Pere is spoken in the village of Bondosso – and marginally in Niantibo – not far from the city of Bouaké, Ivory Coast. Until recently it was also spoken in the village of Kouakoudougou. The speakers are a numu (blacksmith) caste among the Mande.

It had 30 active speakers in 2019 out of an ethnic population that was 700 in the year 2000.

Speakers are shifting to the neighbouring Manding language Koro, and the language has large numbers of Manding loanwords.

Classification
Mbre does not appear to belong to any of the traditional branches of the Niger–Congo language family. It doesn't have the verb extensions or noun classes characteristic of the Atlantic–Congo languages. Roger Blench suspects it may form its own branch, though perhaps not far from the Kwa languages.

Phonology
The phonology section below is sourced from Heath & Tioté (2019).

There are two tones, a /H/ and /L/, but phonetically /L/ may be realized as mid tone when followed by another /L/. Grammatical use of tone includes the distinction between perfective and imperfective aspect.  

There are seven vowel qualities, with an ATR distinction in the mid vowels, but no vowel harmony. All seven may be long or short, nasal or oral. /CVɾV/ tends to be realized as [CəɾV] for any short vowel. 

The consonant inventory is also typical for the area, with marginal /h/ and /ʔ/. 

 
Additionally, there are the phonemes /l/, /ɾ/, /w/, /j/. /CjV/ and /CwV/ sequences occur.

Grammar
Nouns have "absolute" suffix /a/ that appears at the end of a noun phrase and in citation form. Word order is SVOX. There are phrasal verbs with postpositions.

References

Further reading
Blench, Roger. 2010. ''Bɛrɛ: a language of Côte d’Ivoire of unknown affiliation. Language Isolates in Africa workshop. Lyon, December 3-4, 2010.
Heath, Jeffrey. 2019. Pere lexicon. https://zenodo.org/record/3354193#.Y5dr-8HMJmo
Heath, Jeffrey and Brahima Tioté. 2019. A grammar of Pere (Bere, Mbre) of Côte d'Ivoire. Language Description Heritage Library. https://zenodo.org/record/3346581#.Y5drTcHMJmo

Atlantic–Congo languages
Languages of Ivory Coast